The Aslandağ Dam is a gravity dam on the Bembo River (an eventual tributary of the Great Zab) in Şemdinli district of Hakkâri Province, southeast Turkey. Under contract from Turkey's State Hydraulic Works, Özdoğan Group began construction on the dam in 2008 and it was complete in 2012. In July 2012 suspected Kurdistan Workers' Party (PKK) militants set fire to equipment at the construction sites of the Aslandağ Dam and also the Beyyurdu Dam which is located downstream.

The reported purpose of the dam is water storage and it can also support a hydroelectric power station in the future. Another purpose of the dam which has been widely reported in the Turkish press is to reduce the freedom of movement of PKK militants. Blocking and flooding valleys in close proximity to the Iraq–Turkey border is expected to help curb cross-border PKK smuggling and deny caves in which ammunition can be stored. A total of 11 dams along the border; seven in Şırnak Province and four in Hakkâri Province were implemented for this purpose. In Hakkâri are the Gölgeliyamaç (since cancelled) and Çocuktepe Dams on the Güzeldere River and the Aslandağ and Beyyurdu Dams on the Bembo River. In Şırnak there are the Silopi Dam on the Hezil River and the Şırnak, Uludere, Balli, Kavşaktepe, Musatepe and Çetintepe Dams on the Ortasu River.

See also
List of dams and reservoirs in Turkey

References

Dams in Hakkâri Province
Gravity dams
Dams completed in 2012
Dams in the Tigris River basin
Roller-compacted concrete dams